Cotabato or North Cotabato (Maguindanaon: Pangutaran Kutawatu (Jawi: ڤڠوترن كوتاواتو)), officially the Province of Cotabato, is a landlocked province in the Philippines located in the Soccsksargen region in Mindanao. Its capital is the city of Kidapawan. Some of its barangays are under the jurisdiction of the nearby Bangsamoro Autonomous Region.

History

Sultanate of Maguindanao

Cotabato derives its name from the Maguindanaon word kuta watu (from Malay - "Kota Batu"), meaning "stone fort", referring to the stone fort which served as the seat of Sultan Muhammad Kudarat in what is now Cotabato City (which the province derives its name from).

Islam was introduced in this part of the country in the later part of the 15th century by Sharif Mohammed Kabungsuwan, an Arab-Malay Muslim warrior-missionary. Sharif Kabungsuwan invaded Malabang in 1475, facing armed resistance from the non-Muslim natives, nevertheless successfully vanquishing and subjugating them to his (Islamic) rule through the might of his Samal warriors.

Spanish occupation
Christianity was introduced in 1596, but the Spaniards were unable to penetrate into the region until the second half of the 19th century. The district of Cotabato was formed in 1860, covering the areas of what is now Cotabato, Maguindanao and Sultan Kudarat provinces with its capital at Tamontaka. Fort Pikit was established by the Spaniards in 1893 as they continued their conquest of the remnants of Maguindanao Sultanate, which would soon be the site of one of the province's oldest towns, Pikit.

American occupation
The coming of the Americans ushered in the creation of the Moro Province on July 15, 1903, through Act No. 787 of the Philippine Commission. Cotabato, covering what are now the provinces of Cotabato, Maguindanao, Sultan Kudarat, South Cotabato and Sarangani, became a district of the huge Moro province. During the American period, large companies were established in Cotabato to exploit the vast timber resources of the region. By the 1930s, settlers from Luzon and Visayas established homesteads in Cotabato.

World War II

In December 1941, Japanese planes bombed and invaded Cotabato. In 1942, Cotabato was occupied by the Japanese Imperial forces. A military headquarters of the Philippine Commonwealth Army existed in Cotabato from January 3, 1942, to June 30, 1946, and the Philippine Constabulary 10th Constabulary Regiment was stationed in Cotobato from October 28, 1944, to June 30, 1946.  Moro guerrilla fighters operating in the province of Cotabato helped local forces of the Philippine Commonwealth Army and the Philippine Constabulary 10th Constabulary Regiment fight against the Imperial Japanese Army until 1944. The Moro guerrillas fought the Japanese troops until liberation. In 1945, Cotabato was recaptured from the Japanese Imperial forces by the combined Filipino and American troops together with the recognized Moro guerrilla units. The guerrillas used the traditional Moro Kampilan, Barong and Kris swords as their weapons.

Postwar era
The pace of settlement in the region accelerated in the 1950s and 1960s. The former province of Cotabato was once the largest in the Philippines. In 1966, South Cotabato was created as a separate province.

Mindanao, including Cotabato, was relatively peaceful in the 1950s and the mid-1960s. While there were some ethnic tensions, there was essentially no presence of secessionist groups in Mindanao yet.

Martial law era
The relative peace of the postwar era began to change in the last years of President Ferdinand Marcos' first term, when news about the Jabidah massacre ignited a furor in the Moro community, and ethnic tensions encouraged with the formation of secessionist movements. None of these groups had enough followers to form a viable opposition until Marcos declared Martial Law, but when political parties were dissolved upon the proclamation of Martial Law in September 1972, it became easy for the armed secessionist group known as the Moro National Liberation Front to consolidate power, and the decades-long Moro conflict began in earnest.

One major event of Martial law which took place in Cotabato was the Manili massacre, which saw the mass murder of 70 to 79 Moros, including women and children, committed in a mosque in Manili, Carmen, North Cotabato, Philippines on June 19, 1971. The Muslim residents of the town had gathered in their mosque to participate in a supposed peace talk with Christian groups when a group of armed men suspected to be part of the Ilaga militant group opened fire on them.

On November 22, 1973, through Presidential Decree No. 341, what remained of the old Cotabato was further divided into the provinces of North Cotabato, Maguindanao, and Sultan Kudarat. North Cotabato was later renamed Cotabato through Batas Pambansa Blg. 660 approved on March 7, 1984.

Recent history
In 1992, the province of Sarangani was formed out of South Cotabato.

Cotabato now comprises the capital city of Kidapawan and 17 municipalities.

By the aftermath of the plebiscite to form the autonomous administrative region of Bangsamoro in February 2019, 63 barangays from Cotabato's western municipalities, all of which inhabited mostly by Muslim natives, opted to join the newly formed region. This will result in the reduction of the number of barangays the province currently administers after the national midterm elections on May 13, 2019.

Geography

Cotabato covers a total area of  occupying the northeastern tip of Region XII and is centrally located in Mindanao. It is bounded on the north by the provinces of Lanao del Sur and Bukidnon, on the east by Davao City and Davao del Norte, on the west by Maguindanao and on the southeast by Sultan Kudarat and Davao del Sur.

Cotabato is strategically linked to the major "Arterial Road System" that traverses and connects the province to Davao City - Soccsksargen - Cotabato Corridor. The Cotabato via Kabacan - Maramag - Kibawe, Bukidnon Sayre Highway meanwhile serves as its link to the Cagayan de Oro-Iligan City Corridor.

Cotabato stretches from the east at Mount Apo, which separates it from Davao, to the Piapayungan Range on its boundary with Lanao in the west. The province's fertile plains are traversed by tributaries of this great river.

Typhoons do not pass through Cotabato and rainfall is evenly distributed throughout the year.

Administrative divisions

Cotabato comprises 17 municipalities and one city.

Reduction due to the establishment of the Bangsamoro
During the 2001 Referendum for inclusion to the Autonomous Region in Muslim Mindanao, 2 out of 28 barangays of Carmen, Cotabato chose to be part of ARMM, but were excluded because they are not connected to the main region of ARMM. During 2010-2016 Administration, the Bangsamoro ideal sprouted and a newly proposed region was in the making. According to the agreements signed by the Moro Islamic Liberation Front and the Administration of Noynoy Aquino, Carmen will be included in Bangsamoro because of the two out of twenty-eight barangays that voted in favor of joining the Muslim region back in 2001. Unfortunately, Bangsamoro was not implemented before the term of Aquino ended. Despite this, the current administration aims to establish a Federal Government, where Bangamoro will be realized into a State of the Philippines wherein Carmen will be included in Bangsamoro.

Plans to establish a new municipality in the south of Carmen so that the indigenous and Christian central and northern part of Carmen will be retained in North Cotabato has yet to be confirmed. The idea arose because once the entire municipality of Carmen is included in Bangsamoro, the province of North Cotabato will be cut into half, leaving three towns (Banisilan, Alamada, and Libungan) at its west without connection to the center of North Cotabato, isolating these towns in the process.

The issue was partially resolved when the second part of the plebiscite was conducted on February 6, 2019, when 63 barangay from the towns of Pigkawayan, Libungan, Midsayap, Aleosan, Carmen, Banisilan and Pikit opted to join the new administrative autonomous region of Bangsamoro after the results of the region's formation plebiscite were confirmed three days later on February 9. These barangays are to join either the adjacent province of Maguindanao as parts of the said province's nearby and respective municipalities or to cluster on their own as new municipalities within the said province after the national midterm elections on May 13, 2019. The size and population of Cotabato province had officially diminished on November 20, 2019, as the barangays which voted to join the Bangsamoro made their exit from the province and their respective mother municipalities and were officially turned over to the Bangsamoro government as an interim province within the autonomous region divided into several clusters.

Demographics

Based on the 2020 census, Cotabato has an overall population of 1,275,185. The average population growth rate was 2.27% in the period 2010–2015, which is higher than the national average of 1.72%.

Cotabato is an ethnoliguistically diverse province. The first Visayan settlers reached the town of Pikit in 1913, and since then, Christian migrants have moved and lived in Cotabato, cohabitating the province with the local indigenous groups. 71% of Cotabato's population descended from settlers who migrated from the Visayas and Luzon, while the remaining 18% belong to the communities of Magindanaons, Iranuns, Ilianens, Dulangan Manobo, Obo, Tagabawa, and Tboli. The major languages spoken are Hiligaynon (46%), Maguindanao (38%), Cebuano (8%), and Ilocano (4%).

Religion
Cotabato's population is majority Christian. According to the 2010 census, 51.2% of the population are Roman Catholic. Muslims form 26% of the population. The other significant minorities are Evangelical Christians at 8.4% of the population and Iglesia Ni Cristo which forms 1.9% of the Province population. In 2015 the Philippine Statistics Authority recorded Islam followed by 39.28% of the population.

Economy

Cotabato is considered a major food basket in Mindanao. It is a top producer of cereals, tropical fruits, vegetables, sugarcane, coconut, coffee, freshwater fish and livestock.

It is also one of the country's leading producers of raw and semi-processed rubber and industrial trees, with markets in Asia and Europe.

Power utility in the province comes from two energy sources - the NAPOCOR Agus Grid in Iligan transmitted through its Tacurong Substations and the Mindanao 1 Geothermal Power Plant at the foot of Mt. Apo in Ilomavis, Kidapawan City which produces 97 megawatts of electricity. Power distribution is handled by Cotabato Electric Cooperative, Inc. (COTELCO).

The province has a  road network connecting the major centers to each other and the outlying barangays, and communication linkage through NDD-IDD, fax, cellular phone and the internet is available.

Government
President Benigno Aquino III signed the law dividing to new 3 legislative district of Cotabato on September 14, 2012. The representative shall continue to serve until next national election.

Elected provincial officials
House of Representatives
1st District — Rep. Joel Sacdalan
2nd District — Rep. Rudy Caodagan
3rd District — Rep. Maria Alana Samantha Talino Santos

 Governor: Emmylou "Lala" Talino-Mendoza
 Vice Governor: Efren Pinol

References

External links

 
 
 Province of Cotabato
 Philippine Standard Geographic Code

 
Provinces of the Philippines
Provinces of Soccsksargen
States and territories established in 1914
1914 establishments in the Philippines